The gens Priscia was an obscure plebeian family at ancient Rome.  No members of this gens are mentioned in history, but several are known from inscriptions.  A family of this name settled at Virunum in Noricum.

Origin
The nomen Priscius is derived from the common cognomen , old or elder.

Praenomina
The praenomina associated with the Priscii are Gaius, Titus, Publius, and Quintus, all of which were among the most common names throughout Roman history.

Members

 Priscia, named in an inscription from Ateste in Venetia and Histria.
 Priscia, named in a list of heirs from Narbo in Gallia Narbonensis.
 Priscia, the wife of Tertianus, named in an inscription from Virunum in Noricum.
 Priscius, buried at Rome, aged eight years, and nine months, on the sixteenth day before the Kalends of February.
 Priscius, named in an inscription from Colonia Claudia Ara Agrippinensium in Germania Inferior.
 Gaius Priscius C. f., named in an inscription from Rome, dating to AD 184.
 Titus Priscius, named in an inscription from Agedincum in Gallia Lugdunensis, dating to the reign of Trajan.
 Priscia Albina, one of the wives of Julius Secundinus, buried in his family sepulchre at Flavia Solva in Noricum.
 Priscia Amanda, the wife of Publius Cestus, buried at Comum in Cisalpine Gaul, aged fifty-five years, five months.
 Priscia Calliope, wife of Priscius Marcianus, whom she buried at Durocortorum in Gallia Belgica.
 Gaius Priscius Crescentinus, named in an inscription from the temple of Mithras at Virunum.
 Priscius Eustochus, a freedman, dedicated a tomb at Lugdunum to his companion, Lucius Sabinius Cassianus, together with Cassianus' widow, Flavia Livia.
 Priscia C. f. Iantulla, buried at Virunum, was the sister of Priscia Prima, Quintus Priscius Priscianus, Gaius Priscius Statutus, and Publius Priscius Verecundus.
 Priscius Marcianus, buried at Durocortorum in a tomb dedicated by his wife, Priscia Calliope.
 Gaius Priscius Oppidanus, named in two inscriptions from Virunum in Noricum, one of them dating between AD 182 and 184.
 Priscia C. f. Prima, buried at Virunum, was the sister of Priscia Iantulla, Quintus Priscius Priscianus, Gaius Priscius Statutus, and Publius Priscius Verecundus.
 Quintus Priscius C. f. Priscianus, buried at Virunum, was the brother of Priscia Iantulla, Priscia Prima, Gaius Priscius Statutus, and Publius Priscius Verecundus, and the husband of Venustina.
 Priscia Restituta, donated forty thousand sestertii to the temple of Jupiter Optimus Maximus in AD 101, according to an inscription from Ligures Baebiani in Samnium
 Titus Priscius Sabinus, along with Gaius Sextilius Severus, one of the heirs of Gaius Braecius Verus, a Dalmatic soldier buried at Ravenna in Cisalpine Gaul, aged forty.
 Gaius Priscius C. f. Statutus, buried at Virunum, was the brother of Priscia Iantulla, Priscia Prima, Publius Priscius Verecundus, and Quintus Priscius Priscianus, and the husband of Barbia Venusta.
 Gaius Priscius C. l. Surio, a freedman, and husband of Septima, buried at Virunum.
 Gaius Priscius Vegetus, buried at Virunum.
 Publius Priscius C. f. Verecundus, buried at Virunum, was the brother of Priscia Iantulla, Priscia Prima, Gaius Priscius Statutus, and Quintus Priscius Priscianus.

See also
 List of Roman gentes

References

Bibliography

 Theodor Mommsen et alii, Corpus Inscriptionum Latinarum (The Body of Latin Inscriptions, abbreviated CIL), Berlin-Brandenburgische Akademie der Wissenschaften (1853–present).
 Giovanni Battista de Rossi, Inscriptiones Christianae Urbis Romanae Septimo Saeculo Antiquiores (Christian Inscriptions from Rome of the First Seven Centuries, abbreviated ICUR), Vatican Library, Rome (1857–1861, 1888).
 Ettore Pais, Corporis Inscriptionum Latinarum Supplementa Italica (Italian Supplement to the Corpus Inscriptionum Latinarum), Rome (1884).
 René Cagnat et alii, L'Année épigraphique (The Year in Epigraphy, abbreviated AE), Presses Universitaires de France (1888–present).
 George Davis Chase, "The Origin of Roman Praenomina", in Harvard Studies in Classical Philology, vol. VIII (1897).
 John C. Traupman, The New College Latin & English Dictionary, Bantam Books, New York (1995).
 Gabrielle Kremer, Antike Grabbauten in Noricum.  Katalog und Auswertung von Werkstücken als Beitrag zur Rekonstruktion und Typologie (Ancient Tombs in Noricum: Catalog and Evaluation of Workpieces to Contribute to Reconstruction and Typology, abbreviated AGN), Österreichisches Archäologisches Institut, Vienna (2001).

Roman gentes